Barn Burning is a 1980 American short film directed by Peter Werner and starring Tommy Lee Jones.  It is based on the 1939 short story of the same name by William Faulkner.

Cast
Tommy Lee Jones as Abner Snopes
Diane Kagan as Mother Snopes
Carolyn Coates as Lula De Spain
Michael Riney as Brother
Shawn Whittington as Sarty Snopes
Jimmy Faulkner as Major De Spain
Jennie Hughes
Julie Kaye Townery
Al Scott
Jean Pettigrew
Henry Fonda as narrator

References

External links
 

1980 films
American short films
1980 short films
Films directed by Peter Werner
Films based on works by William Faulkner
Films with screenplays by Horton Foote
1980s English-language films